Leon Crosswhite (born April 28, 1951) is a former American football fullback.

College career
Crosswhite attended University of Oklahoma and played for the Sooners football team as a Running back  part of the Wishbone formation, from 1970 to 1973.

NFL career
He played for the Detroit Lions from 1973 to 1974. He was drafted by the Detroit Lions in the 1973 NFL Draft. On January 28, 1975, Crosswhite was traded to the New England Patriots. On September 3, 1975 the Patriots placed Crosswhite on injured reserve.

References

1951 births
Living people
People from Kingfisher County, Oklahoma
Players of American football from Oklahoma
American football running backs
Oklahoma Sooners football players
Detroit Lions players